Kjetil Borch (born 14 February 1990) is a Norwegian representative rower. He is a dual Olympian, an Olympic medallist and a two-time world champion. He has been selected as a 2021 Tokyo Olympian and is expected to make his third Olympic appearance racing the single scull for Norway.

Rowing career
Born in Tønsberg, Norway Borch began rowing in 2001, before taking a break and then starting again in 2004. He rows from the Horten Roklubb on the Oslofjord near Tonsberg. Borch made his national representative debut for Norway in a quad scull at the World Junior Rowing Championships in Beijing in 2007  and then rowed in a double scull at 2008 World Junior Championships. In 2009 he finished third in the double scull at the World Rowing U23 Championships with Truls Albert in bow seat.

In 2010 he moved into the Norwegian senior men's squad and teamed up with Nils Jakob Hoff. They placed fourth in the double sculls event at the 2010 World Rowing Championships. They stuck together throughout 2011 and 2012 finishing in overall seventh place at the 2012 London Olympics before finally topping the podium with a gold medal win and world championship success at the 2013 World Rowing Championships in Chungju.

After a tenth placing with Hoff at the 2014 World Championships and a twelfth placing at the 2015 World Championships Borch paired up with
five time Olympian Olaf Tufte who was vying for his sixth. They lifted their ranking throughout 2016, qualified for the Rio Olympics at the final European qualification regatta and ultimately won a bronze medal in the men's double sculls in Rio de Janeiro, Brazil.

Borch rowed on with Tufte in 2017 and they placed fifth at the 2017 World Rowing Championships but in 2018 he moved into the single scull. He won gold at the 2018 European Championships and a month later won his second world championship title in the men's single sculls at the 2018 World Rowing Championships in Plovdiv, Bulgaria. He took bronze in the single at the 2019 World Rowing Championships and the 2020 European Championships. He qualified the single scull for Norway for the 2021 Tokyo Olympics based on 2019 performances, was selected to represent in that boat and won the silver medal at those delayed Olympics.

Borch represented for Norway in the men's single scull at the 2022 World Rowing Championships and qualified through to the A Final.

References

External links
 
 
 
 

1990 births
Living people
Norwegian male rowers
Sportspeople from Tønsberg
Rowers at the 2012 Summer Olympics
Rowers at the 2016 Summer Olympics
Rowers at the 2020 Summer Olympics
Olympic rowers of Norway
World Rowing Championships medalists for Norway
Olympic silver medalists for Norway
Olympic bronze medalists for Norway
Olympic medalists in rowing
Medalists at the 2016 Summer Olympics
Medalists at the 2020 Summer Olympics